The navy blue Guy Laroche dress of Hilary Swank refers to the navy blue backless Guy Laroche dress worn by Hilary Swank at the 77th Academy Awards on February 27, 2005. In a poll by Debenhams published in The Daily Telegraph the dress was voted the 16th greatest red carpet gown of all time. Cosmopolitan magazine cited the dress as one of the Best Oscar dresses of all time, saying, "Making a serious comeback from that pink gauze number two years before, Hilary shows off her flawless back in this stunning sapphire gown by Guy Laroche. Appropriately, this is the year she won the Oscar for Best Actress in Million Dollar Baby, because that's exactly what she looks like in this dress."

See also
 List of individual dresses

References

2000s fashion
Outfits worn at the Academy Awards ceremonies
2005 works
2005 in fashion
Blue dresses